The River Almond is a tributary of the River Tay in Perth and Kinross, Scotland. It rises in the hills to the south-east of Loch Tay, and flows eastwards through Glenalmond. It runs through the village of Almondbank, before joining the Tay immediately north of Perth.

The Inveralmond Brewery and Industrial Estate of the same name are situated near the mouth of the Almond where it joins the Tay north of Perth.

References

Almond
1Almond